HD 30963 is a star in the constellation of Eridanus. With an apparent magnitude of 7.23, it cannot be seen with the naked eye. Parallax measurements put the star at a distance of around 1,022 light-years (313 parsecs).

HD 30963 is a late B-type star. It is a mercury-manganese star, a class of chemically peculiar star that has an overabundance of certain elements like mercury. HD 30963 has 150,000 times as much mercury, 2,500 times as much platinum, 1,000 times as much yttrium, and 150 times as much zirconium compared to the Sun.

HD 30963 is close to the orbit that the solar system is traversing in the Milky Way. The sun will be close to the current location of HD 30963 in about 18.5 million years. Interstellar absorption lines for Na I are present for velocities lower than 10 km/s.

References

Extra reading

B-type giants
Mercury-manganese stars
Durchmusterung objects
030963
022588
Eridanus (constellation)